

Surrey County

Kingston and Saint Andrew
Chinese Sanitarium
Hope Institute 
Andrews Memorial Hospital (private)
Bellevue Hospital (BVH)
Bustamante Hospital for Children (BHC)
El Shaddai Medical Centre Jamaica
Gynae Associates Hospital (private)
Heart Institute of the Caribbean
Kingston Public Hospital (KPH)
Maxfield Park Medical Center
Medical Associates Hospital (private)
National Chest Hospital (NCH)
Nuttall Memorial Hospital (private)
Sir John Golding Rehabilitation Center
St. Joseph's Hospital
University Hospital of the West Indies (UHWI)
Victoria Jubilee Hospital (VJH)

Portland Parish
Buff Bay Hospital
Port Antonio Hospital

Saint Thomas Parish
Princess Margaret Hospital

Middlesex County

Clarendon Parish
Chapelton Hospital
Lionel Town Community Hospital  
May Pen Hospital

Manchester Parish
Hargreaves Hospital (Private)
Mandeville Hospital 
Percy Junior (Spalding Community) Hospital

Saint Ann Parish
Alexandria Community Hospital
St. Ann's Bay Hospital

Saint Catherine Parish
Linstead Hospital
Spanish Town Hospital

Saint Mary Parish
Annotto Bay Hospital
Port Maria Hospital

Cornwall County

Saint Elizabeth Parish
Black River Hospital

Saint James Parish
Cornwall Regional Hospital (CRH)
Doctors Hospital (private)
Hospiten Montego Bay (private)
Montego Bay Hospital (private)
Trinity Mall Medical (private)

Trelawny Parish
Falmouth Hospital (Falmouth, Jamaica)

Westmoreland 
Royale Medical Centre (private)
Savanna-la Mar Public Hospital

Hanover 
 Noel Holmes Hospital

See also

 
Hospitals
J
Jamaica